E2D International (E2D) was the political international of the Electronic Direct Democracy (E2D) Party movement. The E2D Manifesto described the basic political principles of E2D International member parties. Most of the member parties are defunct. The swedish Direktdemokraterna remains as the last active party as of November 2020.

Project

To help create and promote parties with only one element in their program: Direct Democracy ("a form of democracy in which sovereignty is lodged in the assembly of all citizens who choose to participate").

E2D parties were to be politically non-partisan and their agenda entirely based on people’s decision, determined by means of referendums and initiatives organized by party members and citizens. These organized systems were supposed to allow citizens to vote on propositions of laws submitted by elected members of parliament, but also to propose new laws.

Mission

The mission for Electronic Direct Democracy (E2D) International was:

to help establish, to support and promote, and to maintain communication and co-operation between neutral electronic direct democracy parties around the world.

The E2D Manifesto

The E2D Manifesto, collaboratively drafted in February 2011 by representatives from Citizens for Direct Democracy, Online Party of Canada, Partido de Internet, Aktiv Demokrati, Demoex, Senator Online and Partidul Romania Online using Participedia.net, was a document which described the basic political principles of E2D International. The E2D Manifesto was inspired by the ideas of Aki Orr, amongst others.

Parties 

E2D was active in several countries.

See also 

 Anticipatory democracy
 Collaborative e-democracy
 Collaborative governance
 Consensus democracy
 Deliberative democracy
 Demarchy
 Direct democracy
 E-participation
 E-democracy
 Electronic direct democracy
 Grassroots democracy
 Inclusive Democracy
 Open source governance
 Non-partisan democracy
 Participatory budgeting
 Participatory economics
 Participatory justice
 Public incubator
 Public sphere
 Public participation
 Radical transparency
 Rationality and power
 Sociocracy
 Workers' council

References 
This page incorporates content from Participedia under the Creative Commons ShareAlike Unported 3.0 licence.

Further reading
Orr, A. (2007). Big Business, Big Government or Direct Democracy: Who Should Shape Society? online version
 Gutmann, A. D., Thompson, F. (2004). "Why Deliberative Democracy?", Princeton University Press, Google Books
 Surowiecki, James (2004). The Wisdom of Crowds: Why the Many Are Smarter Than the Few and How Collective Wisdom Shapes Business, Economies, Societies and Nations Little, Brown 
Ober, Josiah (1989). Mass and Elite in Democratic Athens: Rhetoric, Ideology and the Power of the People. Princeton
Ober, Josiah and C. Hendrick (edds) (1996). Demokratia: a conversation on democracies, ancient and modern. Princeton
 Raaflaub K. A., Ober J., Wallace R. W. (2007) Origins of Democracy in Ancient Greece, University of California Press.

External links 

Aktiv Demokrati
Citizens for Direct Democracy
Dimopolis
Democratici Diretti
Direct Democracy Party of New Zealand
Demoex
Hayeshira
Online Party of Canada
OurNZ Party
Partido de Internet
Partidul Romania Online
Party of Internet Democracy
Senator Online
Svojpolitik.si
Map of Worldwide Direct or Fluid Democracy

Direct democracy movement
Non-profit technology
Elections